The Crystal Palace Football Club Player of the Year is awarded at the end of each season. Since the inaugural award was made to John McCormick in 1972, 37 players have won the award. Nine of these players have won the award for a second time, the most recent being Wilfried Zaha. Three players have received the award on more than two occasions, Zaha and Jim Cannon have won it three times and Julián Speroni four times. Paul Hinshelwood was the first to win the trophy in consecutive seasons, a feat since emulated by Andrew Johnson, Julián Speroni and Wilfried Zaha, with the latter two going on to win in a third consecutive season. The current incumbent of the award is Conor Gallagher, who was the 2021–22 recipient.

Key
 denotes a player registered with Crystal Palace in the 2022–23 season.
Player (X) denotes the number of times a player has won the award.

Winners

Statistics

Wins by playing position

Wins by nationality

References
General
 
 

Specific

Player of the Year
Crystal Palace Player of the Year
Association football player non-biographical articles
Awards established in 1972
1972 establishments in England